Stefani Skerlevska (born 30 March 1997) is a Macedonian footballer who plays as a defender. She has been a member of the North Macedonia women's national football team.

References

1997 births
Living people
Women's association football defenders
Macedonian women's footballers
North Macedonia women's international footballers